San Jerónimo Taviche  is a town and municipality in Oaxaca in south-western Mexico. The municipality covers an area of 213.06 km². 
It is part of the Ocotlán District in the south of the Valles Centrales Region

As of 2005, the municipality had a total population of 1750.

References

Municipalities of Oaxaca